L'Été Indien may refer to:

 L'Été indien (television show), a 2014 French-language television talk show from Québec
 "L'Été indien", a 1975 French song by Joe Dassin